The A2 Autoroute is a French autoroute that travels 76 km from the A1 near the commune of Combles in Picardy to the border with Belgium, where it continues on as the Belgian motorway A7. The entire length is concurrently designated as European route E19.

In conjunction with the A1 autoroute and the Belgian A7 it is the main route between Paris and Brussels. Until other more direct motorway routes are completed it is also the fastest route from Paris to the Belgian city of Liège.

From Combles to Cambrai, the autoroute is managed by the Société des Autoroutes du Nord et de l'Est de la France (SANEF) and is a toll road. From Cambrai onward it is a non-toll autoroute managed by the government of the Nord départment. Two lanes travel in each direction.

The A2 was opened in 2 stages in 1972. The first stage from junction 15 to the Belgian border opened on the 28th of March. The remainder, from Junction 15 to the interchange with the A1 opened on the 19th of December 1972.

Lists of Exits and Junctions

European Routes

A02